The Embassy of Iceland in Ottawa, Ontario provides Icelandic diplomatic representation in Canada. The embassy is also responsible for Iceland's relations with Belize, Bolivia, Colombia, Costa Rica, Ecuador, Honduras, Panama, Peru, Nicaragua, Uruguay and Venezuela.

The Consulate General in Winnipeg, Manitoba, falls within the Embassy's jurisdiction. The Icelandic Trade Representative in New York serves as Trade Representative to Canada as well.

The embassy was established in May 2001 and is located on the seventh floor of Constitution Square Tower 1, an office building in the city's downtown.

The current ambassador is Hlynur Guðjónsson.

References

External links
 Embassy of Iceland in Ottawa, Canada

Iceland
Ottawa
Canada–Iceland relations